Maruti Rao may refer to:

 S. Maruti Rao, an Indian cinematographer who worked mainly in Tamil films.
 Marutirao Parab, an Indian actor and director best known for playing comic roles in Hindi films.